Hannah Ord is a BAFTA   winning Actor for her role in Last Night in Edinburgh.

Film and Television

References

External links 

Scottish child actresses
BAFTA winners (people)
21st-century Scottish actresses
Living people
Year of birth missing (living people)
Place of birth missing (living people)